Gebhardt is a German surname.  Notable people with the surname include:

 Deborah Gebhardt, basketball coach and scientist
 Dixie Cornell Gebhardt (1866–1955), American designer of the state flag of Iowa
 Eric "Red Mouth" Gebhardt, American singer-songwriter
 Eduard von Gebhardt (1838–1925), Baltic German historical painter
 Elke Gebhardt (born 1983), German racing cyclist
 Evelyne Gebhardt (born 1954), German politician
 Georg Gebhardt (1901–1975), German military officer during World War II
 George Gebhardt (1879–1919), Swiss-born American silent film actor
 Håkon Gebhardt (born 1969), Norwegian musician and record producer
 Karl Gebhardt (1897–1948), German Nazi SS physician who conducted criminal medical experiments, executed for war crimes
 Liz Gebhardt (1945–1996), English actress
 Marcel Gebhardt (born 1979), German footballer
 Marco Gebhardt (born 1972), German footballer
 Mike Gebhardt (born 1965), American sailor
 Miriam Gebhardt, architect, writer
 Oscar von Gebhardt (1844–1906), German Lutheran theologian
 Rio Gebhardt (1907–1944), German pianist, conductor and composer
 Robert Gebhardt (1920–1986), German footballer and manager
 Steffen Gebhardt (born 1981), German pentathlete
 Volk Gebhardt, 16th-century Slovenian politician
 Zack Gebhardt, American Statistician

See also
 A.L. Gebhardt & Co., a leather tanning company that operated in Milwaukee, Wisconsin and Berlin, Germany
 Gephardt

German-language surnames